In Islamic terminology, something which is makruh (transliterated: makrooh or makrūh) is a disliked or offensive act (literally "detestable" or "abominable"). This is one of the five categories (al-ahkam al-khamsa) in Islamic law – wajib/fard (obligatory), Mustahabb/mandub (recommended), mubah (neutral), makruh (disapproved), haram (forbidden).

Though a makruh act is not haram (forbidden) or subject to punishment, a person who abstains from this act will be rewarded. Muslims are encouraged to avoid such actions when or as possible. It is one of the degrees of approval (ahkam) in Islamic law.

Acts considered makruh can vary between different madhhabs due to differing scholarly interpretations of the Quran and Hadith, with Hanafi scholars in particular differing from the other madhhabs in regards to classification of makruh.

Overview 
Actions that are reprehensible and violate rules of Fiqh are considered to be makruh.

Makruh is considered to be of two types:

 Makruh Tahrimi, مکروہ تَحریمی - Actions disliked in the same vein as haram actions, but does not have definitive proof and instead uses speculative evidence for their prohibition. Unlike haram actions, committing these types of actions does not lead to unfaithfulness. This type of makruh is primarily cited by Hanafi scholars when issuing Fatwa, and is not used by scholars of other madhhabs.
 Makruh Tanzihi, مکروه تنزیهی - Not strictly forbidden according to scholars, but is disliked if done. Engaging in actions that are considered this type of makruh will not lead to punishment, but avoiding these types of actions will bring one closer to God. This type of makruh is primarily used by all madhhabs, and is interchangeable with the word makruh in most cases.
The Hanafi school uses the makruh tahrimi classification on the basis that there is doubt (but not extremely significant) in the chain of narration and/or authenticity of a Hadith that provides evidence that a particular act is considered haram. All other madhhabs would consider classifying an act as haram in this case.

Examples

Some of the examples of something considered makruh are the use of a great amount of water when performing ritual purifications known as the wudu (partial ablution, or abdest) and ghusl (full ablution) or the consumption of garlic before attending the mosque or socializing with others.

An example of a food which is considered makruh for Muslims of the Hanafi school is prawns (but only for the Hanafi school). There are, however, shared attitudes within the Hanafi school of whether shrimp are considered water game and are thereby halal. Hanafis believe in refraining from it and in eating something else if possible.

An example in regards to clothing that is considered makruh is wearing garments below the ankle. However, debate among scholars, particularly of the Maliki school, has led to some considering it haram while others maintain it is makruh.

While the wearing of silk garments and gold jewelry by men is considered haram in all other schools, the Hanafi school considers it makruh tahrimi due to doubt in the chain of narration and authenticity of the Hadith in which this evidence is sourced.

Another example of makruh tahrimi is making an offer to buy something that has an offer already placed by another person. Similarly to the rule on men and silk garments, the Hanafi school considers it makruh tahrimi since the Hadith in which the evidence is found has some doubt to the chain of narration. 

Other examples of makruh acts in Islam include swearing, talking while taking ablutions for prayer, and slaughtering an animal for food where other animals of its kind can see it.

See also 
 Mustahabb

References

Arabic words and phrases in Sharia
Islamic jurisprudence
Islamic terminology
Islamic ethics
Ritual purity in Islam
Sharia legal terminology